Gezo of Turin (died 1011) was an Italian bishop. He was bishop of Turin from 1000 until his death in 1011.

In 1006 Gezo founded the monastery of San Solutore in Turin, which was dedicated to saints Solutor, Octavius and Adventor, who were the patrons of the city of Turin. Also in 1006 Gezo was present – at the request of Pope John XVIII – at the consecration of the Abbey of Fruttuaria, alongside other bishops from the region.

References
F. Savio, Gli antichi vescovi d’Italia. Il Piemonte (Turin, 1899), pp. 335–339. 
 N. Bulst, Untersuchungen zu den Klosterreformen Wilhelm von Dijon (962-1031) (Bonn 1973).

Notes

11th-century Italian Roman Catholic bishops
Bishops of Turin
1011 deaths